The 2019 Lagos State House of Assembly election was held on 9 March 2019, to elect members of the Lagos State House of Assembly in Nigeria. All the 40 seats were up for election in the Lagos State House of Assembly. APC won all the 40 available seats.

Upon the opening of the 9th State House of Assembly, Mudashiru Obasa (APC-Agege I) was elected as Speaker of the House while Wasiu Sanni (APC-Lagos Island I) and Agunbiade Sanai (APC-Ikorodu I) became Deputy Speaker and House Leader, respectively.

Results

Agege I 
APC candidate Mudashiru Obasa won the election.

Agege II 
APC candidate Ogundiran Olayinka won the election.

Amuwo Odofin I 
APC candidate Mojisola Alli-Macaulay won the election.

Amuwo Odofin II 
APC candidate Rauf Olawale won the election.

Alimosho I 
APC candidate Yusuf Adebisi won the election.

Alimosho II 
APC candidate Kehinde Joseph won the election.

Ajeromi/Ifelodun I 
APC candidate Olumoh Lukman won the election.

Ajeromi Ifelodun II 
APC candidate Olatunji Fatai won the election.

Apapa I 
APC candidate Mojisola Meranda won the election.

Apapa II 
APC candidate Olumuyiwa Jimoh won the election.

Badagry I 
APC candidate Ibrahim Olanrewaju won the election.

Badagry II 
APC candidate Setonji David won the election.

Epe I 
APC candidate Mustairu Abiodun won the election.

Epe II 
APC candidate Ogunkelu Sylvester won the election.

Eti Osa I 
APC candidate Adams Babatunde won the election.

Eti Osa II 
APC candidate Yishawu Gbolahan won the election.

Ibeju Lekki I 
APC candidate Mojeed Adebola won the election.

Ibeju Lekki II 
APC candidate Kazeem Raheem won the election.

Ifako Ijaye I 
APC candidate Adewale Temitope won the election.

Ifako Ijaye II 
APC candidate Makinde Rasheed won the election.

Ikeja I 
APC candidate Folajimi Mohammed won the election.

Ikeja II 
APC candidate Adedamola Kasunmu won the election.

Kosofe I 
APC candidate Sanni Babatunde won the election.

Kosofe II 
APC candidate Olatunde Braimoh won the election.

Ikorodu I 
APC candidate Agunbiade Sanai won the election.

Ikorodu II 
APC candidate Solaja-Saka Nurudeen won the election.

Lagos Mainland I 
APC candidate Ibrahim Olatunbosun won the election.

Lagos Mainland II 
APC candidate Moshood Olanrewaju won the election.

Mushin I 
APC candidate Akinsanya Nureni won the election.

Mushin II 
APC candidate Saburi Olawale won the election.

Ojo I 
APC candidate Victor Akande won the election.

Ojo II 
APC candidate Tijani Suraju won the election.

Lagos Island I 
APC candidate Wasiu Sanni won the election.

Lagos Island II 
APC candidate Olanrewaju Afinni won the election.

Somolu I 
APC candidate Oloworotimi Emmanuel won the election.

Somolu II 
APC candidate Abiru Rotimi won the election.

Surulere I 
APC candidate Desmond Elliott won the election.

Surulere II 
APC candidate Sangodara Mosunmola won the election.

Oshodi/Isolo I 
APC candidate Sokunwe Hakeem won the election.

Oshodi/Isolo II 
APC candidate Idumogu Emeka won the election.

References 

Lagos State House of Assembly elections
House of Assembly
Lagos